Brad Doody (born 17 August 1973) is a New Zealand cricketer. He played in 25 first-class and 53 List A matches for Canterbury from 1995 to 2002.

See also
 List of Canterbury representative cricketers

References

External links
 

1973 births
Living people
New Zealand cricketers
Canterbury cricketers
Cricketers from Rangiora